The H-1B1 visa (and associated H-1B1 status) is a variant of the H-1B visa in the United States for nationals of Singapore and Chile. The version for Singapore is called the H-1B1-Singapore and the version for Chile is called the H-1B1-Chile. These categories were introduced with the Singapore–United States Free Trade Agreement and Chile–United States Free Trade Agreement respectively, both of which were ratified in 2003 by the 108th United States Congress (and signed into law by George W. Bush, the President of the United States at the time) and became active on January 1, 2004. The visas are also called FTA visas because they were provided for through Free Trade Agreements (FTAs).

H-1B1 is distinct from the E-3 visa for Australian nationals, even though both are variants of the H-1B. It is also distinct from the TN visa and associated status for residents of Canada and Mexico, which is associated with the North American Free Trade Agreement (NAFTA).

Relation with the H-1B program

Of the 65,000 visas allocated to the capped H-1B visa program, the amount of 6,800 are reserved for use for the H-1B1: 1,400 for Chile and 5,400 for Singapore. All approved applications for H-1B1 classification, including those that involve issuance of a visa and those that involve a change of status, are counted towards these limits.

Unused slots in the H-1B1 program in a given fiscal year get added to the general H-1B quota for the next fiscal year.

Nationals of Chile and Singapore can still avail of the usual H-1B visa. This might be advantageous for some of them because the H-1B program places fewer restrictions along some dimensions.

Program details and differences with the usual H-1B program requirements

Two ways of obtaining H-1B1 classification

There are two different ways a person can obtain H-1B1 status necessary to start a job on H-1B1:

 The worker can apply for a H-1B1 visa at the home country consulate (nationals of Singapore can apply for a H-1B1 visa only at the U.S. Embassy in Singapore, and nationals of Chile can apply for a H-1B1 visa only at the U.S. Embassy in Chile). 
 If already in the United States on another status, the employer can file a Form I-129 (Petition for a Nonimmigrant Worker) on the worker's behalf.

When the visa application or Form I-129 petition is approved, the worker can legally begin working on the H-1B1 classification on or after the indicated start date. Even for I-129 applicants, however, once the worker leaves the US to travel abroad, he/she must return home (Singapore or Chile) to a U.S. consulate for a new H-class visa stamp to re-enter the US. Please note that acquiring this visa stamp would require the worker to prove non-immigrant intent, without which his/her application may be denied, and he/she may not be able to return to the U.S.

Labor Condition Application

As is the case with the H-1B visa and E-3 visa, the employer needs to have a Labor Condition Application (LCA) approved by the United States Department of Labor in order for the employee to be eligible for the H-1B1 status or visa. The LCA form is the same as for the H-1B visa, but needs to be annotated "H-1B1-Singapore" or "H-1B1-Chile" as the case may be. An employer may use a single LCA for multiple applicants as long as they all fall within the same category (i.e., they must all be in a single one of the categories: H-1B, H-1B1-Singapore, H-1B1-Chile, E-3).

An approved LCA is a prerequisite for applying for H-1B1 classification (whether in the form of a H-1B1 visa or in the form of Form I-129 for change of status).

Eligibility criteria

Definition of specialty occupation

The concept of specialty occupation used for the H-1B1 status is somewhat broader than that used for the H-1B. Specifically, although the normal minimum requirement for an H-1B is a specialized bachelor's degree, the trade agreements with Chile and Singapore permit alternate credentials in certain professions:

 Agricultural managers and physical therapists (for Chilean workers)
 Management consultants and disaster relief claims adjusters (for Chilean or Singaporean workers).

Employer-employee relationship

As with the H-1B visa, it is necessary that there be a clear employer-employee relationship between the petitioning employer and the applicant. In particular, the H-1B1 visa applicant cannot be self-employed or an independent contractor.

Non-immigrant intent

The H-1B visa is a dual intent visa, i.e., people who arrive on this visa may have partial immigrant intent. On the other hand, the H-1B1 visa is a non-immigrant intent visa, and applicants for the visa must clearly demonstrate such intent by demonstrating the following three things:

 has a residence abroad,
 has no immediate intention of abandoning that residence, and
 intends to depart the U.S. upon the termination of the visa.

However, an intent to immigrate in the future, which is in no way connected to the proposed immediate trip, is not in itself grounds to deny the alien an H-1B1.

Note that, as with most non-immigrant statuses, the burden of demonstrating non-immigrant intent falls only at the time of visa application. Those who achieve the H-1B1 classification through a change of status via Form I-129 do not need to demonstrate non-immigrant intent -  until they travel outside the U.S., after which they must return to their home country and apply for a H-class visa to re-enter the U.S.

Renewable one-year admission

Admission on a H-1B1 visa is for 18 months, but the status can be renewed in yearly increments. Unlike the H-1B visa, there is no six-year limit. However, the associated Labor Condition Application is valid for only three years (initial) or two years (renewals), so after expiry, a new LCA must be filed and used to support the petition.

Visa for spouses

The spouses of H-1B1 status holders are eligible for the H-4 visa and associated status, same as for the spouses of H-1B status holders.

Differences with H-1B program

Usage of the program

Below, the number of approved H-1B visa and H-1B1 visa applications from Singapore, Chile, and globally are listed. The H-1B1 classification became active on January 1, 2004, and the first H-1B1 visa approvals happened in Fiscal Year 2004. Note that these are visa approvals, not the total number of classifications made. This would cause a slight lag in the statistics, because people from Singapore and Chile who were already in H-1B status would continue to apply for H-1B visas when their original visas expired, rather than switch to H-1B1 status (even if they'd have chosen the latter had the option been present originally). However, even as late as Fiscal Years 2011-2013 (by which time most H-1B visa approvals would correspond to classifications made after the introduction of the H-1B1):

 The total number of H-1B visa approvals from Singapore and Chile was roughly comparable to the total number of H-1B1 visa approvals.
 In absolute numbers, the sum of H-1B and H-1B1 visa approvals had gone up by about 30% relative to the number of H-1B visa approvals before the introduction of the H-1B1.

References

United States visas by type
Employment of foreign-born